Anthony Musgrave (9 July 18954 June 1959) was an Australian entomologist. Born in Queensland, Australia, he is known for penning Bibliography of Australian Entomology (1932). He was the great-nephew of Anthony Musgrave who was Secretary of State for the Colonies.

Early life
Anthony Musgrave was born 9 July 1895 in Cooktown, Queensland, Australia. His father was Anthony Musgrave, a civil servant, and his mother was Elizabeth Anne (née Colles). He studied at the Hayfield Preparatory School in Homebush and the Sydney Church of England Grammar School.

Career
As an entomologist, Musgrave is known for his 1932 work, Bibliography of Australian Entomology. He worked at the Australian Museum, initially as a librarian for a year, before climbing up the ranks to become Assistant Entomologist, and eventually the museum's entomologist, a title later changed to "Curator of Insects and Arachnids". He displayed much knowledge on insects and arachnids; his area of expertise were ticks and venomous spiders. Musgrave was compiler of all of the Australian Science Abstracts''' animal-related articles for around twenty years, until in 1957 when the publication folded.  He was also a contributor to the Australian Encyclopaedia'' (editions 1 and 2).

Personal life and death
Musgrave was described as an "excellent lecturer and photographer". He led a luxurious and peaceful life and was an avid golfer. In his later years, little was heard about him; Musgrave did not like publicity. He died at the Royal North Shore Hospital in Sydney on 4 June 1959. The cause of death was listed as heart disease.

See also

 List of entomologists

References

Further reading
 

1895 births
1959 deaths
Australian entomologists
20th-century Australian zoologists
Scientists from Queensland